Knoutsodonta depressa is a species of sea slug, a dorid nudibranch, a shell-less marine gastropod mollusc in the family Onchidorididae.

Distribution
This species was described from Whitley Bay, Northumberland, England. It is currently known from Norway south to the Atlantic coast of France and the Mediterranean Sea. Reports from other parts of the world are doubtful and specimens from Brasil have been described as Knoutsodonta brasiliensis.

References

Onchidorididae
Gastropods described in 1842